Agustín Bouzat (born 28 March 1994) is an Argentine professional footballer who plays as a forward for Colo-Colo on loan from Vélez Sarsfield.

Career
Bouzat started his senior career in 2011 with Liniers, playing twelve times in Torneo Argentino B. He joined Boca Juniors of the Argentine Primera División in early 2012. In January 2016, Bouzat completed a season-long loan move to fellow Primera División team Defensa y Justicia. He scored on his professional debut, in a 2–2 draw with Unión Santa Fe on 7 February. In total, Bouzat went on to make forty-five appearances for the club and scored three goals. He returned to Boca Juniors ahead of the 2017–18 campaign and made his league debut on 23 September 2017 in a 0–4 win against Vélez Sarsfield.

Ahead of January 2018, Bouzat departed Boca Juniors to join Vélez Sarsfield. His first appearance for Vélez came versus former club Defensa y Justicia on 27 January.

In June 2022, he was loaned to Colo-Colo by Vélez Sarsfield on a deal for eighteen months with an option to buy.

Career statistics
.

References

External links

1994 births
Living people
Sportspeople from Bahía Blanca
Argentine people of French descent
Argentine footballers
Association football midfielders
Torneo Argentino B players
Argentine Primera División players
Liniers de Bahía Blanca players
Boca Juniors footballers
Defensa y Justicia footballers
Club Atlético Vélez Sarsfield footballers
Chilean Primera División players
Colo-Colo footballers
Argentine expatriate footballers
Expatriate footballers in Chile
Argentine expatriate sportspeople in Chile